A CAS Registry Number (also referred to as CAS RN or informally CAS Number) is a unique identification number assigned by the Chemical Abstracts Service (CAS), US to every chemical substance described in the open scientific literature. It includes all substances described from 1957 through the present, plus some substances from as far back as the early 1800s. It is a chemical database that includes organic and inorganic compounds, minerals, isotopes, alloys, mixtures, and nonstructurable materials (UVCBs, substances of unknown or variable composition, complex reaction products, or biological origin). CAS RNs are generally serial numbers (with a check digit), so they do not contain any information about the structures themselves the way SMILES and InChI strings do.

The registry maintained by CAS is an authoritative collection of disclosed chemical substance information. It identifies more than 182 million unique organic and inorganic substances and 68 million protein and DNA sequences, plus additional information about each substance. It is updated with around 15,000 additional new substances daily. A collection of almost 500 thousand CAS registry numbers are made available under a CC-BY-NC license at ACS Commons Chemistry.

Use 

Historically, chemicals have been identified by a wide variety of synonyms. Frequently these are arcane and constructed according to regional naming conventions relating to chemical formulae, structures or origins. Well-known chemicals may additionally be known via multiple generic, historical, commercial, and/or (black)-market names.

CAS Registry Numbers (CAS RN) are simple and regular, convenient for database searches. They offer a reliable, common and international link to every specific substance across the various nomenclatures and disciplines used by branches of science, industry, and regulatory bodies. Almost all molecule databases today allow searching by CAS Registry Number.

Format 
A CAS Registry Number has no inherent meaning, but is assigned in sequential, increasing order when the substance is identified by CAS scientists for inclusion in  the CAS REGISTRY database.

A CAS RN is separated by hyphens into three parts, the first consisting from two up to seven digits, the second consisting of two digits, and the third consisting of a single digit serving as a check digit. This format gives CAS a maximum capacity of 1,000,000,000 unique numbers.

The check digit is found by taking the last digit times 1, the preceding digit times 2, the preceding digit times 3 etc., adding all these up and computing the sum modulo 10. For example, the CAS number of water is 7732-18-5: the checksum 5 is calculated as (8×1 + 1×2 + 2×3 + 3×4 + 7×5 + 7×6) = 105; 105 mod 10 = 5.

Granularity 
 Stereoisomers and racemic mixtures are assigned discrete CAS Registry Numbers: L-epinephrine has 51-43-4, D-epinephrine has 150-05-0, and racemic DL-epinephrine has 329-65-7
 Different phases do not receive different CAS RNs (liquid water and ice both have 7732-18-5), but different crystal structures do (carbon in general is 7440-44-0, graphite is 7782-42-5 and diamond is 7782-40-3)
 Commonly encountered mixtures of known or unknown composition may receive a CAS RN; examples are Leishman stain (12627-53-1) and mustard oil (8007-40-7).
 Some chemical elements are discerned by their oxidation state, e.g. the element chromium has 7440-47-3, the trivalent Cr(III) has 16065-83-1 and the hexavalent Cr(VI) species have 18540-29-9.
 Occasionally whole classes of molecules receive a single CAS RN: the class of enzymes known as alcohol dehydrogenases has 9031-72-5.

Search engines 
 CHEMINDEX Search via Canadian Centre for Occupational Health and Safety
 ChemIDplus Advanced via United States National Library of Medicine
 Common Chemistry via Australian Inventory of Chemical Substances
 European chemical Substances Information System via the website of Royal Society of Chemistry
 HSNO Chemical Classification Information Database via Environmental Risk Management Authority
 Search Tool of Australian Inventory of Chemical Substances
USEPA CompTox Chemicals Dashboard

See also 
 Academic publishing
 Beilstein Registry Number
 Chemical file format
 Dictionary of chemical formulas
 EC# (EINECS and ELINCS, European Community)
 EC number (Enzyme Commission)
 International Union of Pure and Applied Chemistry
 List of CAS numbers by chemical compound
 MDL number
 PubChem
 Registration authority
 UN number

Notes

External links 

 CAS registry description, by Chemical Abstracts Service

To find the CAS number of a compound given its name, formula or structure, the following free resources can be used:
 NLM, NIH ChemIDplus
 NIST Chemistry WebBook
 NCI/CADD Chemical Identifier Resolver
 ChemSub Online (Multilingual chemical names)
 NIOSH Pocket Guide to Chemical Hazards, index of CAS numbers

Chemical numbering schemes
American Chemical Society
Unique identifiers